Park Ji-hyun (born November 26, 1994) is a South Korean actress and model. She is best known for her role in the television series Rookie Historian Goo Hae-ryung and in the films Gonjiam: Haunted Asylum and The Divine Fury.

Biography and career
Park Ji-hyun studied at Hankuk University of Foreign Studies. She joined the agency Namoo Actors in 2016. She made her debut as an actress in 2017. Nominated for the Rookie of the Year Award at the 39th Blue Dragon Film Awards in 2018 and at the 24th Spring Festival in 2019, she has taken on several memorable roles in both films and television dramas, since her debut, including those in Your Honor and The Divine Fury.

Filmography

Film

Television series

Awards and nominations

References

External links

  at Namoo Actors 

1994 births
Living people
21st-century South Korean actresses
South Korean female models
South Korean television actresses
South Korean film actresses
Hankuk University of Foreign Studies alumni